Novica Cerović (1805–1895) was a Montenegrin vojvoda (duke) of the Drobnjak clan, who is noted as having defeated and killed a local Ottoman tyrant, Smail-aga Čengić, on the auspices of Petar II Petrović-Njegoš, the Prince-Bishop of Montenegro. He later became a senator in the Montenegrin government.

Life

Cerović was born in Tušina, a village near Šavnik in the Drobnjaci clan, then part of the Ottoman Empire (today in Montenegro). His most noted act was leading a successful assault to kill local Ottoman tyrant Smail-aga Čengić under the auspices of Petar II Petrović-Njegoš thereby freeing parts of Herzegovina from the Ottoman Empire and joining them to the Principality of Montenegro.

Legacy
His heroism and the death of Smail-aga Čengić was the theme of Ivan Mažuranić's poem Smrt Smail-age Čengića, an epic poem celebrating the struggle for freedom.

There is a tower in Tušina named after him (the Tower of Duke Novica Cerović).

See also
Gavro Vuković

References

External links

 Istorijska biblioteka: Sat Smail-age Čengića
 Montenegrina - digitalna biblioteka: Ban crnogorski Novica Cerović

1805 births
1895 deaths
People of the Principality of Montenegro
People from Šavnik
Drobnjaci
Dukes of Montenegro